The State of Brazil was one of the states of the Portuguese Empire, in the Americas during the period of Colonial Brazil.

History 
In 1621, the Governorate General of Brazil was split into two states, the State of Brazil and the State of Maranhão. The state was created on June 13, 1621 by Philip II of Portugal.

This action divided Portuguese America into two administrative units, with the capital of the State of Brazil located in São Salvador and the capital of the State of Maranhão located in São Luís.

The State of Brazil became a Viceroyalty in January 1763, when the capital of the State of Brazil was transferred from Salvador to Rio de Janeiro.

Composition 

The State of Brazil originally included 12 of the original 15 captaincies, all except Ceará (which became subordinate to Pernambuco later) and Maranhão, two parts, which included the subcaptaincy of Para west of the Tordesillas Line at that time (north to south):

Captaincy of Rio Grande de Norte
Captaincy of Paraíba (southern Rio Grande & Itamaraca)
Captaincy of Pernambuco
Captaincy of Bahia
Captaincy of Ilhéus (became a comarca of Bahia in 1761)
Captaincy of Porto Seguro
Captaincy of Espírito Santo
Captaincy of Rio de Janeiro (São Tomé and São Vicente first section)
Captaincy of Santo Amaro
Captaincy of São Vicente (second section, later renamed Captaincy of São Paulo e Minas de Ouro)
Captaincy of Santana

Captaincies created by the state
Captaincy of Alagoas 1817 from Pernambuco
Captaincy of Ceará 1799 re-split from Pernambuco (previously existed as one of 15 original donatary captaincies)
Captaincy of Goiás
Captaincy of Mato Grosso
Captaincy of Minas Gerais
Captaincy of São Paulo
Captaincy of Sergipe 1820 from Bahia
Captaincy of Rio Grande do Sul (from region of Rio Grande de Sao Pedro)
Captaincy of Santa Catarina

See also 
 List of governors-general of Brazil

References

External links

Brazil
Colonial Brazil
Portuguese colonization of the Americas
Brazil
Former subdivisions of Brazil
1621 establishments in Brazil
1815 disestablishments in Brazil

he:מדינת ברזיל
lt:Brazilijos vicekaralystė